Bésame  may refer to:

"Bésame Mucho", Spanish-language song written in 1940 by Mexican singer Consuelo Velázquez
Besame Mucho El Musical, jukebox musical featuring bolero songs from the 1920s and 1930s
"Bésame" (Camila song), song recorded by Mexican band Camila for their second album Dejarte de Amar
"Bésame", 2001 song by Ricardo Montaner
"Bésame", 2010 song by Jay Del Alma featuring Münchener Freiheit (band)
"Bésame" (Gian Marco song), 2018 song by Peruvian singer-songwriter Gian Marco for his thirteenth studio album Intuición

See also
"Bésame sin miedo", song recorded by the Mexican group RBD for their third Spanish studio album Celestial
Bésame Tonto, 2003 Spanish-language television soap opera that was produced jointly by Peruvian and Venezuelan producers